Ana Maria Covrig (born 8 December 1994) is a Romanian former professional racing cyclist, who rode professionally between 2014 and 2019 for the , ,  and  teams.

She won ten national road titles during her career, winning both the Romanian National Road Race Championships and Romanian National Time Trial Championships five times consecutively between 2015 and 2019.

See also
 List of 2015 UCI Women's Teams and riders

References

External links

1994 births
Living people
Italian female cyclists
Romanian female cyclists
Sportspeople from Cluj-Napoca
Cyclists at the 2015 European Games
European Games competitors for Romania
21st-century Romanian women